Every year sudden cardiac arrest (SCA) kills between 35,000 and 45,000 people in Canada and approximately 350,000 people in the United States; 85% of SCAs are caused by ventricular fibrillation (VF). Receiving defibrillation from an automated external defibrillator (AED) is a key component of the 'chain of survival' for victims of SCA. Chances of survival from a SCA decrease by 7–10% every minute that a victim does not receive  defibrillation. Attempts at reducing time until defibrillation have largely focused on improving traditional emergency medical service (EMS) responders and implementing publicly available defibrillator (PAD) programs. In the United States approximately 60% of SCAs are treated by EMS. Equipping police vehicles with AEDs and incorporating them in the emergency dispatching process when a SCA is suspected, can reduce the time until defibrillation for a victim suffering an out-of-hospital sudden cardiac arrest. There are numerous studies which confirm a strong coloration between equipping police vehicles with AEDs and reduced time until defibrillation which ultimately translates into improved survival rates from SCA. As a result of these demonstrable statistics, police departments across North America have begun equipping some or all of their police vehicles with AEDs.

United States 
In the 1990s three extensive studies, which examined different elements of police AED programs, occurred in Allegheny County, PA; Rochester, MN; and Miami, FL. The purpose of these studies was to examine the effectiveness of equipping police with AEDs, their ability to provide reduced response times in rural and suburban communities and how this translates to improved survival rates from SCA. The police departments which originally took part in these studies retained their adopted capabilities and now contribute to some of the highest survival rates from SCA in the country.

Allegheny County, PA 
Between January 1, 1990, and January 31, 1995, a study was conducted across 7 rural municipalities in Allegheny County, Pennsylvania. This study examined the impact of dispatching police officers who were equipped with AEDs, to suspected SCAs, on survival rates from SCA in rural communities. In total, 200 police officers received CPR and AED training and 30 AEDs were deployed. Over the course of the study a 3.5 minute (51%) decrease in the interval between the 9-1-1 call and the application of the AED was observed. The study concluded that in the "7 suburban communities, police use of AEDs decreased time to defibrillation and was an independent predictor of survival to hospital discharge."

Rochester, MN 
In November 1990, the Rochester Minnesota Police Department received 4 defibrillators to equip 4 patrol vehicles. This initiative began as a part of a study to examine how effective police vehicles that were equipped with AEDs were at improving survival rates from SCA. The number of AEDs grew until in 2006, every marked police vehicle in the department had an AED. As of September 2011, this program has saved over 142 lives. As of September 2013, Rochester Minnesota achieved a survival rate from SCA of 58%, which is  due to their Police AED Program.

Miami Dade County, FL 
In 1999 the Miami Dade Police Department partnered with the Metropolitan Miami-Dade County Public Health Trust and the Miami Heart Research Institute to examine the impact of police responders in combination with EMS on response times and survival rates from SCA. In 1999, between February 1 and July 1, all Miami-Dade police officers were equipped with AEDs. This program involved 1900 police officers across 9 districts. The Metropolitan Miami-Dada County 9-1-1 emergency dispatching system was adjusted to accommodate a dual dispatching process. The results of this study indicated that dispatching police officers equipped with AEDs simultaneously with traditional EMS, in a large urban area can provide substantially reduced response times. This improved response time directly related to improved survival rates for victims of SCA with ventricular fibrillation or pulseless ventricular tachycardia (VF/VT). During this experiment, the survival rate for witnessed victims of SCA with VT/VF who were assisted by simultaneously dispatched police and EMS was 24%. The survival rate for witnessed victims of SCA with VT/VF who were assisted by EMS alone was 10.5%. The results of these studies have influenced many police departments throughout North America to adopt similar defibrillator programs for their vehicles.

Police departments in the United States which equip their patrol vehicles with automated external defibrillators

Canada 
Several police departments in Canada equip their patrol vehicles with defibrillators; however, this practice remains inconsistent. Within the Royal Canadian Mounted Police (RCMP) there are no federal regulations that necessitate equipping RCMP vehicles or detachments with AEDs. Despite this there are currently four departments within the RCMP which do deploy AEDs.  These departments are the Prime Minister Protective Detail, the Emergency Medical Response Team (EMRT), the Division Fitness and Lifestyle and "E" Division.

E Division of the RCMP operates in the province of British Columbia and is responsible for federal, provincial and municipal policing services throughout the province, with the exception of 11 communities. Despite the absence of federal regulations requiring RCMP officers to be equipped with AEDs, the BC Provincial Policing Standards state that, as of January 30, 2013, "the chief constable, chief officer, or commissioner must:

(1) Ensure that, for a rural police force that provides policing to a jurisdiction of less than 5,000 population, Conducted Energy Weapon (CEW) operators who have been assigned a CEW while on‐duty must also be equipped with an AED that is to be carried in their police vehicle.
(2) Ensure that, for an urban police force that provides policing to a municipality of greater than 5,000 population, all on‐road patrol supervisors must be equipped with AEDs that are to be carried in their police vehicles.
(3) Ensure that all officers who are authorized to use an AED receive and maintain training in accordance with Emergency and Health Services Commission consent requirements for police use of an AED."

The BC Provincial Policing Standards were updated to include the clause related to AEDs, after the release of the Braidwood Inquiry. The Braidwood Inquiry was a public inquiry which examined the safety of Tasers or CEWs after the death of Robert Dziekański.  Robert Dziekański died after being tasered 5 times by RCMP officers. In August 2014 Constable Brian Mulrooney, an RCMP officer from "E" Division who was equipped with an AED, was dispatched to a suspected sudden cardiac arrest at Snug Cove, Bowen Island. Constable Mulrooney arrived within 2–3 minutes with the AED and administered multiple shocks to the victim. The victim was revived and flown to the Vancouver General hospital for further assistance.

In Canada there are three provincial police departments; the Ontario Provincial Police (OPP), the Sûreté du Québec and the Royal Newfoundland Constabulary (RNC). None of the three provincial police departments equip their police cruisers with AEDs, for the purpose of responding to suspected SCAs; however, many municipal police departments equip their police cruisers with AEDs and incorporate them in the emergency response process when a SCA is suspected.

Police departments in Canada which equip patrol vehicles with automated external defibrillators

References

Police vehicles
Law enforcement in North America